Aggregated diamond nanorods, or ADNRs, are a nanocrystalline form of diamond, also known as nanodiamond or hyperdiamond.

Discovery 

Nanodiamond or hyperdiamond was produced by compression of graphite in 2003 by a group of researchers in Japan and in the same work, published in Nature, it was shown to be much harder than bulk diamond. Later it was also produced by compression of fullerene and confirmed to be the hardest and least compressible known material, with an isothermal bulk modulus of 491 gigapascals (GPa), while a conventional diamond has a modulus of 442–446 GPa; these results were inferred from X-ray diffraction data, which also indicated that ADNRs are 0.3% denser than regular diamond. The same group later described ADNRs as "having a hardness and Young's modulus comparable to that of natural diamond, but with 'superior wear resistance'".

Hardness 
A <111> surface (normal to the largest diagonal of a cube) of pure diamond has a hardness value of 167±6 GPa when scratched with a nanodiamond tip, while the nanodiamond sample itself has a value of 310 GPa when tested with a nanodiamond tip. However, the test only works properly with a tip made of harder material than the sample being tested due to cracking. This means that the true value for nanodiamond is likely lower than 310 GPa. Due to its hardness, a hyperdiamond could possibly exceed 10 on the Mohs scale of mineral hardness.

Synthesis 
ADNRs (hyperdiamonds/nanodiamonds) are produced by compressing fullerite powder—a solid form of allotropic carbon fullerene—by either of two somewhat similar methods. One uses a diamond anvil cell and applied pressure ~37 GPa without heating the cell. Extreme hardness of what now appears likely to have been nanodiamonds was reported by researchers in the 1990s. The material is a series of interconnected diamond nanorods, with diameters of between 5 and 20 nanometres and lengths of around 1 micrometre each.

Nanodiamond aggregates ca. 1 mm in size also form in nature, from graphite upon meteoritic impact, such as that of the Popigai impact structure in Siberia, Russia.

See also

References

External links

The invention of aggregated diamond nanorods at Physorg.com

Nanomaterials
Allotropes of carbon
Superhard materials